Koebeliini is a tribe of leafhoppers in the subfamily Deltocephalinae. There are 6 genera and over 15 species divided into two subtribes within Koebeliini: Koebellina and Grypotina. Koebeliina species are endemic to western North America.

Genera 
There are 6 described genera divided into two subtribes:

Subtribe Koebellina 

 Koebelia Baker, 1897

Subtribe Grypotina

References 

Cicadellidae
Insects described in 1929
Insects of North America